He Yang (born 23 February 1983 in Tianjin) is a former Chinese international footballer.

Club career
While He Yang graduated from the Tianjin Teda youth team during the 2002 league season he struggled to break into the first team until the 2003 league season when he made thirteen league appearances. Often coming on as a substitute throughout much of his career he had difficulty in establishing himself as regular and was often criticised for his lack of concentration within defence, nevertheless he remained with Tianjin even when he was completely dropped from the senior team in the 2008 league season. When the 2009 league season began centre-back Wang Xiao was injured early within the campaign and the coach Zuo Shusheng immediately recalled He Yang back into the team as his replacement, with another chance to prove himself within the team He Yang showed considerable maturity and physical ability that was missing in his earlier career. He Yang would suddenly rise to prominence and establish himself as an integral member within the team, even scoring his debut goal against Shanghai Shenhua on May 16, 2009 in a 1–1 draw. When Arie Haan came into the team as the new coach He Yang would remain an integral part of the team and go on to help Tianjin come runners-up of the 2010 Chinese Super League season.

On 11 February 2015, He transferred to China League One side Qingdao Jonoon. After two seasons he moved to another League One club in Zhejiang Yiteng on 14 January 2017. This was followed by a move to fourth tier club Chengdu Better City in the 2018 Chinese Champions League season where he played an integral part in seeing the club gain successive promotions. At the end of the 2020 China League One season his contract would expire with Chengdu after three seasons with the club. On 24 February 2021, He would announce his retirement from professional football.

International career
He Yang would make his international debut in a friendly against Iran in a 1–0 win on 1 June 2009 where he played the game as a right-back. He would then be included in the squad that won the 2010 East Asian Football Championship but did not play within any of the games.

Career statistics

Club statistics
.

Honours

Club
Tianjin Teda F.C.
 Chinese FA Cup: 2011

Country
 East Asian Football Championship: 2010

References

External links 
 
 Player stats at sohu.com

1983 births
Living people
Chinese footballers
Footballers from Tianjin
China international footballers
Tianjin Jinmen Tiger F.C. players
Qingdao Hainiu F.C. (1990) players
Zhejiang Yiteng F.C. players
Chengdu Better City F.C. players
Chinese Super League players
China League One players
China League Two players
Association football defenders